Kirill Vadimovich Gotsuk (born 10 September 1992) is a Russian professional football player. He plays as a centre-back for FC Pari Nizhny Novgorod.

Club career
He made his Russian Football National League debut for FC Shinnik Yaroslavl on 11 July 2016 in a game against FC Baltika Kaliningrad.

He played in the 2017–18 Russian Cup final for FC Avangard Kursk on 9 May 2018 in the Volgograd Arena against 2-1 winners FC Tosno.

He made his Russian Premier League debut for FC Nizhny Novgorod on 26 July 2021 in a game against PFC Sochi.

Honors
Russian Cup runner-up:2017-18
FNL Cup:2019
Individual
FNL Cup Best Defender:2019

Career statistics

References

External links
 
 
 

1992 births
People from Yelets
Sportspeople from Lipetsk Oblast
Living people
Russian footballers
Association football defenders
FC Metallurg Lipetsk players
FC Shinnik Yaroslavl players
PFC Krylia Sovetov Samara players
FC Avangard Kursk players
FC Nizhny Novgorod (2015) players
Russian Premier League players
Russian First League players
Russian Second League players